Won't Go Quietly is the second studio album from British recording artist Example. It was released as a digital download on 20 June 2010, with the physical release the following day. Noted producers that helped with the album include Calvin Harris, Sub Focus and Chase & Status. As of December 2012, the album has sold 265,000 copies in the UK.

Critical reception

Won't Go Quietly received generally positive reviews up on its release. Robert Copsey of Digital Spy gave a positive review stating that "Won't Go Quietly is an entertaining and relentlessly catchy collection from an artist who could, on first glance, be accused of shamelessly following the latest chart trends". BBC music also gave the album a positive review stating that it's "perfect contemporary chart material".

Singles

 The first single to be released from the album was "Watch the Sun Come Up" and was released on 20 September 2009. The single peaked at number 19 on the UK Singles Chart and number 3 on the UK Dance Chart.
 The second single to be released from the album was "Won't Go Quietly" and was released on 18 January 2010. The single peaked at number 6 on the UK Singles Chart and number 1 on the UK Dance Chart, as well as number 36 on the Irish Singles Chart.
 The third single to be released from the album was "Kickstarts" and was released on 13 June 2010. The single peaked at number 3 on the UK Singles Chart and number 1 on the UK Dance Chart as well as number 8 on the Irish Singles Chart, making it Example's most successful single at the time.
 The fourth single to be released from the album was "Last Ones Standing" and was released on 12 September 2010. The single peaked at number 27 on the UK Singles Chart and number 7 on the UK Dance Chart.
 The fifth and final single to be released from the album was "Two Lives" and was released on 14 November 2010. The single has peaked at number 10 on the UK Dance Chart and 84 on the UK Singles Chart.
 The original mix of "Hooligans" was released as a single on 28 June 2009. However, only the VIP mix of the song features on the album. The single failed to chart but was Gleave's first signing to Data Records.

Track list

Personnel

 Example – vocals
 The Fearless – producer, mixing
 Don Diablo – producer, mixing
 Calvin Harris – producer, mixing
 MJ Cole – producer, mixing
 Bjorn Yttling – producer
 Sub Focus – producer, mixing
 Chase & Status – producer, mixing
 iSHi – producer
 Bart B More – producer
 Funkagenda – producer
 Wire – producer
 Alex Smith – additional producer
 David Stewart – additional producer
 Wez Clarke – mixing, programming, additional production
 Phil Faversham – mixing, programming, additional production
 Alex Smith – additional vocals
 Pearse Macintyre – additional vocals
 Dr.Dolittles – additional vocals
 Bjorn Yttling – additional vocals
 Jamie Scott – additional vocals
 David Stewart – additional vocals
 Takura Tendayi – additional vocals
 MJ Cole – keyboards
 Funkagenda – keyboards
 Eddie Jenkins – additional keyboards
 Amir Izadkhah – bass
 Nakia Matthewson – artwork
 Will Jack – artwork
 Steven Eaves – photography
 Mark Surridge – additional photography
 Tom Chambers – additional photography
 Will Barnes – styling

Chart performance

Weekly charts

Year-end charts

References

2010 albums
Albums produced by Calvin Harris
Albums produced by Chase & Status
Example (musician) albums